Song of the Range is a 1944 American musical Western film directed by Wallace Fox and starring Jimmy Wakely, Dennis Moore and Lee 'Lasses' White.

Cast
 Jimmy Wakely as Jimmy 
 Dennis Moore as Denny 
 Lee 'Lasses' White as Lasses 
 Cay Forester as Dale Harding 
 Sam Flint as John Winters 
 Hugh Prosser as Bruce Carter 
 George Eldredge as Federal Agent CleveTrevor 
 Steve Clark as Sheriff Duncan
 Edmund Cobb as Thomas 'Tom' Manning 
 Cedric Stevens as Chase - Mesa Inn Manager 
 The Sunshine Girls as Singers 
 Johnny Bond as Johnny

References

Bibliography
 Martin, Len D. The Allied Artists Checklist: The Feature Films and Short Subjects of Allied Artists Pictures Corporation, 1947-1978. McFarland & Company, 1993.

External links
 

1944 films
1940s Western (genre) musical films
American Western (genre) musical films
Films directed by Wallace Fox
Monogram Pictures films
American black-and-white films
1940s English-language films
1940s American films